Mediaset Plus was an Italian entertainment television channel which started broadcasting on 1 December 2008, carrying an entertainment-themed programming produced by Mediaset. It closed on 2 July 2011, and its programs were moved to the digital channels La5 and Mediaset Extra.

Programming

Domenica Cinque
Mattino Cinque
Pomeriggio Cinque
Studio Aperto
TG5
Verissimo
Matrix

External links
 
 

Mediaset television channels
Television channels and stations established in 2008
Italian-language television stations
Television channels and stations disestablished in 2011
Sky Italia
Defunct television channels in Italy
2008 establishments in Italy
2011 disestablishments in Italy